"The Most Toys" is the 22nd episode of the third season of the American science fiction television series Star Trek: The Next Generation, and the 70th episode of the series overall.

Set in the 24th century, the series follows the adventures of the Starfleet crew of the Federation starship Enterprise-D.  In this episode, Lieutenant Commander Data (Brent Spiner) is kidnapped by an obsessive collector, who leads the Enterprise crew to believe that Data was destroyed in a shuttlecraft accident. The episode's title references a quote popular in the 1980s, "Whoever dies with the most toys wins".

Plot

The Enterprise-D is called to assist the colony on planet Beta Agni II, which has suffered contamination to its water supply. They meet with the Jovis, a ship owned by the Zibalian trader Kivas Fajo (Saul Rubinek), a trader who happens to have hytritium, the extremely rare compound needed to neutralize the contamination. The volatile substance cannot be beamed aboard, so Lieutenant Commander Data (Brent Spiner) is assigned to make several shuttle trips to collect the cargo. Just before the final trip, Data is kidnapped, and his shuttle is rigged to explode. The Enterprise crew scan the debris and finding trace elements matching Data, they believe he is dead, and are forced to leave to continue their mission.

Data is reactivated in a secured room and is met by Fajo, who explains he collects rare and valuable objects and has kidnapped Data due to his uniqueness. Fajo's assistant Varria tells Data to change out of his Enterprise uniform and to sit in his chair. Data refuses to follow orders and remarks that they are both Fajo's prisoners.

Mourning the loss of their friend, Geordi is certain that he is missing something about Data's destruction. Geordi takes his hypothesis to Picard and Riker, stating that the reason he can't find anything is there's nothing to indicate a malfunction. He explains that the only option is pilot error, but doesn't believe it as the odds are too vast to calculate. Picard gives him some words of solace and dismisses him. Picard and Riker select Worf as Data's replacement.

In an effort to make Data comply with his wishes, Fajo says that he isn't at war with anyone and is in fact Data's liberator. He prods Data about whether or not he is capable of killing anyone, and Data states that he is programmed to never kill except in defense, and thus would be incapable of murder. When Data still refuses to submit, Fajo splashes a solvent on Data's uniform that dissolves it so he will be compelled to change his clothes.

Geordi and Wesley run through Data's communications during the shuttle trips, with Geordi noting that Data follows protocol to the letter. They observe that Data didn't report the shuttle clearing the cargo bay of the Jovis on the final transmission, per protocol. Geordi and Wesley conclude that for Data to not follow standard procedures there would have to be something wrong with Data himself.

Data remains defiant against Fajo's attempts to make him an object of display, purposely remaining silent and immobile when Fajo shows off his collection to a rival trader (Nehemiah Persoff). Only when Fajo threatens to kill Varria with a very rare and illegal Varon-T disruptor does Data agree to follow Fajo's orders, and sits in the chair.

The Enterprise crew arrives at the colony and uses the hytritium to neutralize the contamination, but finds it works far more quickly than it should, and deduce that the contamination had been caused deliberately, leading them back to Fajo. They return to the last-known location of the Jovis to track Fajo down.

Varria decides to help Data escape. During the attempt they set off alarms that alert Fajo, and when he gets there, he uses the Varon-T disruptor on Varria, killing her without remorse. Data picks up the spare Varon-T that Varria had possessed and threatens to use it on Fajo. Fajo in turn threatens to murder more of his assistants if Data doesn't comply with his demands, believing that Data's programming will prevent him from shooting Fajo and to preserve the assistants' lives by submitting. Fajo further taunts Data to shoot him, mocking him as "just an android" incapable of feeling rage at Varria's death. Data states that he cannot allow this to continue and gets ready to shoot Fajo, much to the latter's shock. The Enterprise arrives and suddenly beams Data back aboard, discovering that the disruptor was in the process of discharging. Data is met in the transporter room by Commander Riker, and requests that Fajo be taken into custody, with Riker responding that arrangements have already been made. When Riker asks why the disruptor was energized, Data only offers that something may have happened during transport.

Data visits Fajo in the brig, where Fajo laments the reversal of their situation, but says defiantly that he will again add Data to his collection one day. Data informs Fajo that his stolen collection has been confiscated, and all his possessions returned to their rightful owners. Fajo remarks, "It must give you great pleasure." Data replies, "No, sir, it does not. I do not feel pleasure. I am only an android." He then leaves a stunned Fajo alone in the brig.

Production

The episode's title comes from a popular saying found on bumper stickers and T-shirts in the 1980s which read, "He who dies with the most toys wins." The quote was originally attributed to flamboyant millionaire Malcolm Forbes. The characters name Kivas Fajo comes from script coordinator Lolita Fatjo, and a mineral mentioned as an item Spock deals in for the episode Errand of Mercy.
Writer  Shari Goodhartz was dissatisfied with the ending and wished she had been able to come up with something more clever, finding it a little too convenient. Spiner agreed with Goodhartz that Data purposefully shot Fajo, but the producers wanted it to be kept ambiguous. Goodhartz said "If I had a chance to do it over, with all the experience I have behind me now, I would argue passionately for Data’s actions and their consequences to have been clearer, and hopefully more provocative."

David Rappaport, a well-known British dwarf actor, had originally been cast for the part of Kivas Fajo. Rappaport struggled with depression during his life, and attempted suicide shortly after filming some scenes as Fajo. (Rappaport later died by suicide on 2 May 1990, three days before the airing of this episode). Saul Rubinek was brought in to take over the role and complete the episode. Select scenes with Rappaport were included in a special In Memoriam reel on disc five of the third-season TNG Blu-ray set.

Makeup supervisor Michael Westmore had designed an alien look for Rappaport but when the role was recast there was not enough time to recreate the alien prosthetics for another actor and had to settle for a small face tattoo. Furthermore, Fajo's assistant Varria had a flatted face and antennae that came out of her forehead, that wove into an alien hairdo. Actress Jane Daly did not like wearing the makeup or the elaborate hairdo and when the costume went for approval she convinced Gene Roddenberry to remove the antennae and change the hair style. Westmore said that instead of looking alien they were left with "a woman with a flat face and an Annette Funicello hairdo" and compared the look to a car crash victim, and noted that they inserted a line into the script to cover how terrible she looked. Westmore said it was his least favorite episode of all his work on Star Trek.

Famous artwork is heavily featured in this episode, to demonstrate Fajo's taste in what he considers unique and valuable.
 Among the artifacts that Fajo has collected, there is a copy of Salvador Dalí's The Persistence of Memory. The copy was created by artist Elaine Sokoloff.
 Although it is never seen, Vincent van Gogh's The Starry Night is mentioned by the Enterprise computer as one of the artifacts collected by Fajo.
 In a small scene before the one where Fajo threatens to kill Varria with a disruptor in order to get Data to obey him, Data is looking at Leonardo da Vinci's famous Mona Lisa, trying to imitate her famously enigmatic smile.

Reception
Zack Handlen of The A.V. Club gave the episode a grade A−. Handlen wrote that in one way the episode could be considered a variation on the episode The Measure of a Man, but that it stands quite well on its own and that "subtle character exploration" of Data gives it its edge. Keith R.A. DeCandido reviewed the episode and gave it 8 out of 10, praising the ambiguous ending, and the performances of Spiner and Rubinek.

In 2014, io9 ranked "The Most Toys" as the 95th best episode of Star Trek in their list of the top 100 Star Trek episodes.

In 2021, Robert Vaux writing for Comic Book Resources, said this was a "strong episode" in season 3, and that it tested the morality of the crew.

Home video 
The episode was released with Star Trek: The Next Generation season three DVD box set, released in the United States on July 2, 2002. This had 26 episodes of Season 3 on seven discs, with a Dolby Digital 5.1 audio track. It was released in high-definition Blu-ray in the United States on April 30, 2013.

References

Resources
 Star Trek The Next Generation DVD set, volume 3, disc 6, episode 2

External links

 

Star Trek: The Next Generation (season 3) episodes
1990 American television episodes
Television episodes about abduction